My Friend the Chauffeur (German: Mein Freund der Chauffeur) is a 1926 German silent comedy film directed by Erich Waschneck and starring Hans Albers, Ferdinand von Alten and Barbara von Annenkoff.

It was made by Germany's largest studio UFA. The film's sets were designed by the art directors Botho Hoefer, Carl Ludwig Kirmse and Bernhard Schwidewski.

Cast
In alphabetical order
 Hans Albers as Sir Ralph Moray  
 Alice Kempen  as Bietsche, Frau Kidders Tochter  
 Oskar Marion as Lord Terry Barrymore  
 Olly Orska as Maida, Frau Kidders Nichte  
 Livio Pavanelli as Fürst Coramini  
 Ferdinand von Alten as Graf Dalmar-Kalm  
 Barbara von Annenkoff as Frau Stanley Kidder  
 Alfred von Schluga as Joseph, der Chauffeur

References

Bibliography
 Hardt, Urusula. From Caligari to California: Erich Pommer's Life in the International Film Wars.  Berghahn Books, 1996.

External links

1926 films
Films of the Weimar Republic
German silent feature films
Films directed by Erich Waschneck
UFA GmbH films
1926 comedy films
German comedy road movies
Films produced by Erich Pommer
Films based on British novels
German black-and-white films
Films based on works by Alice Williamson
Silent comedy films
1920s German films